Yunost Stadium is a football stadium in Osipovichi, Belarus. It is a home stadium for FC Osipovichi. The stadium holds 1,300 spectators.

References

External links
 Stadium information at ABFF website

Football venues in Belarus
Buildings and structures in Mogilev Region